The women's 4 × 100 metre medley relay competition at the 2014 Pan Pacific Swimming Championships took place on August 24 at the Gold Coast Aquatic Centre. The last champion was the United States.

Records
Prior to this competition, the existing world and Pan Pacific records were as follows:

Results
All times are in minutes and seconds.

Heats
Heats weren't performed, as only seven teams had entered.

Final 
The final was held on August 24, at 21:04.

References

2014 Pan Pacific Swimming Championships
2014 in women's swimming